The Longest Day is the 1984 debut album by the Del Fuegos.

Track listing

Personnel
The Del Fuegos:
Dan Zanes - lead vocals, guitar
Warren Zanes - guitar
Tom Lloyd - bass, vocals
Brent "Woody" Giessmann - drums, vocals

Additional personnel:
Jorge Bermudez - percussion
Mitchell Froom - keyboards

External links
 The Longest Day at AllMusic

1984 debut albums
Albums produced by Mitchell Froom
Slash Records albums